Lars Nielsen (born 3 November 1960 in Copenhagen) is a Danish rower.

References 
 
 

1960 births
Living people
Danish male rowers
Rowers from Copenhagen
Rowers at the 1984 Summer Olympics
Olympic bronze medalists for Denmark
Olympic rowers of Denmark
Olympic medalists in rowing
Medalists at the 1984 Summer Olympics